Nonaka (written:  lit. "in the middle of a field") is a Japanese surname. Notable people with the surname include:

, Japanese voice actress
, Japanese ice hockey player
, Japanese politician
, Japanese writer and business theorist
Kingo Nonaka (1889–1977), Mexican combat medic and photographer
, Japanese voice actor
, Japanese hotel manager and supercentenarian
, Japanese sport climber
Shigeru Nonaka (born 1970), Japanese golfer
, Japanese television personality and chief executive
Tori Nonaka, American sport shooter

Fictional characters
, a character in the light novel series The Testament of Sister New Devil

Japanese-language surnames